Robert Dickerson (January 28, 1960 – January 29, 1999), better known as Benjamin, was an American poet and singer-songwriter who fronted the Atlanta, Georgia bands Smoke and the Opal Foxx Quartet. He was noted for being a radical rock 'n' roll performer. He died on January 29, 1999, due to liver failure caused by Hepatitis C at age 39. He performed his final concert in Atlanta, Georgia on New Year's Eve, 1998.

Biography
Benjamin lived for many years in Cabbagetown, an "unsafe" neighborhood in Atlanta, peopled with hustlers and eccentrics. There, he occasionally dressed up as a drag queen from a young age. When he was nine years old, he would appear in public wearing women’s clothing, "with a towel on my head like Whoopi (Goldberg), going to the Waffle House in a dress." In New York City, he found work at the famed club CBGB's, which he described as "the filthiest place I ever was." He earned $20 a day, his duties consisted of sweeping up broken glass left by performers and audiences the evening prior.

Benjamin was a known character in the underground scene in 1980s Atlanta and participated in a number of Atlanta music experiments such as Easturn Stars, Monroe is Naked Again, Summer Complaint, Freedom Puff, Blade Emotion, and the Opal Foxx Quartet (which often had up to 12 members). His bands played in such venues as 688, Celebrity Club, Pillowtex, Destroy All Music Festival, among others. For the band, Benjamin donned the stage name "Miss Opal Foxx." During this time his vocals received media attention and Tom Waits comparisons arose. His voice has since been described as "resembling the roar of a wounded lion".

Benjamin also had a notable stage presence and charisma. As described in the Brooklyn Academy of Music blog:"Donning a frayed, cotton dress and a shabby beehive wig, she drags on her cigarette and teases the audience with intermittent flashes of skin, if only they will pay for a glimpse. Ms. Opal Foxx, né Robert Dickerson, queen of a thriving, close-knit music scene in Cabbagetown, a former mill town in Atlanta, Georgia..." In a review of the Benjamin Smoke documentary, A.O. Scott of the New York Times wrote, "...a wispy, sensitive, self-destructive soul full of sweet beatnik romanticism, pop poetry and entertaining nonsense... Mr. Dickerson, bone thin, his voice ravaged by ill health and cigarettes, has a hustler's easy charm."

After some of the musicians of the group died, the band Smoke was conceived in 1992 with members Bill Taft, Brian Halloran, and Todd Butler. Coleman Lewis and Tim Campion later joined the band, followed by Will Fratesi. Smoke was renowned for his on-stage banter, never shying away from provoking his viewers, "for a faggot, do I have a rockin' band or what?"

Shortly before he died, Benjamin opened for a Patti Smith concert in 1997.

Benjamin was an amphetamine addict and he also had AIDS, though he claimed "HIV is not a death sentence". AIDS brought him closer to his mother, though he eventually lost his life due to liver failure, caused by Hepatitis C.

Discography 

 Jesus Christ Superstar: A Resurrection CD (1994, Daemon Records)
 RARA - House of the Rising Sun 7" (1994)
 LowLife 17 12" w/Freedom Puff (bass only)

Opal Foxx Quartet 
The Love That Won't Shut Up CD (1994, LongPlay Records)

Freedom Puff

Smoke 
 Pretend/Dirt 7" (1993, Colossal Records)
 Another Reason To Fast CD (1995, LongPlay Records)
Heaven on a Popsicle Stick CD (1994, LongPlay Records)

Bands 
 Smoke
 Opal Foxx Quartet
 Baby Weemus
 Freedom Puff
 Easturn Stars
 Medicine Suite
 Knee Deep in Okra
 Beatrice

Filmography 
Benjamin was the subject of a documentary released in 2000 called Benjamin Smoke directed by Jem Cohen and Peter Sillen, filming for which took 10 years. The New York Times and Contactmusic.com criticised the film for not providing much detail about Benjamin's life.

References

American drag queens
American gay musicians
LGBT people from Georgia (U.S. state)
1960 births
1999 deaths
Daemon Records artists
Queercore musicians
20th-century American singers
20th-century American male singers
20th-century American LGBT people
Deaths from liver failure
Deaths from hepatitis